Didymictinae ("double weasels") is an extinct subfamily of mammals from extinct family Viverravidae, that lived from the early Palaeocene to the middle Eocene in North America and Europe.

Classification and phylogeny

Classification
 Subfamily: †Didymictinae 
 Genus: †Bryanictis 
 †Bryanictis microlestes 
 †Bryanictis paulus 
 †Bryanictis terlinguae 
 Genus: †Didymictis 
 †Didymictis altidens 
 †Didymictis dellensis 
 †Didymictis leptomylus 
 †Didymictis protenus 
 †Didymictis proteus 
 †Didymictis vancleveae 
 †Didymictis sp. [Erquelinnes, Hainaut, Belgium] 
 Genus: †Intyrictis 
 †Intyrictis vanvaleni 
 Genus: †Pristinictis 
 †Pristinictis connata 
 Genus: †Protictis (paraphyletic genus) 
 †Protictis agastor 
 †Protictis haydenianus 
 †Protictis minor 
 †Protictis paralus 
 †Protictis simpsoni 
 Subgenus: †Protictoides 
 †Protictis aprophatos 
 Genus: †Raphictis 
 †Raphictis gausion 
 †Raphictis iota 
 †Raphictis machaera 
 †Raphictis nanoptexis 
 Incertae sedis:
 †"Deltatherium" durini

Phylogeny
The phylogenetic relationships of subfamily Didymictinae are shown in the following cladogram:

See also
 Mammal classification
 Viverravidae

References

Viverravids
Paleocene first appearances
Eocene extinctions
Mammal subfamilies